The Gamonal and San Millán de Lara shootings occurred on November 27, 1996 in Gamonal, San Millán de Lara, Province of Burgos, Castile and León, Spain. Juan Medina Gordillo shot and killed six people.

Events
On November 27th, 1996, at approximately 4:00 PM, Juan Medina Gordillo used a shotgun to shoot María del Carmen Delgado Juez and her two brothers in an apartment at 177 Vitoria Street. He then went to San Millán de Lara to shoot the mother of the first three victims, his own mother-in-law and an unidentified friend at his front door. Gordillo then went to the mountains in search of his son-in-law. After failing to find him, Gordillo went back to San Millán de Lara where he fatally shot himself in the heart.

Perpetrator
Juan Medina Gordillo, 53, had a history of harassing María del Carmen Delgado Juez, 23. On April 8th, 1995, she lodged a complaint with the police over threats and harassment. Gordillo had previously threatened Juez and her boyfriend. He was detained and released soon after; he had no police record and claimed he had threatened Juez and her boyfriend with a toy gun.

References

External links
El rastro del crimen - La matanza de Burgos The Trail of Crime - The Burgos Massacre

Un hombre mata a 6 personas y se suicida
Crimen Burgos 1996

 Spree shootings in Spain
1996 mass shootings in Europe
 Family murders
1996 in Spain
1996 murders in Spain